Lukas Grgić (born 17 August 1995) is an Austrian footballer who plays for Croatian club Hajduk Split.

Club career
On 10 January 2022, Grgić signed a 4.5-year contract with Hajduk Split in Croatia.

Personal life
Born in Austria, Grgić is of Croatian descent.

Career statistics

Honours
Hajduk Split
 Croatian Cup: 2021–22

References

External links
 
 

1995 births
People from Wels
Footballers from Upper Austria
Living people
Austrian footballers
Austrian people of Croatian descent
Association football midfielders
FC Wels players
SV Wallern players
LASK players
FC Juniors OÖ players
SV Ried players
WSG Tirol players
HNK Hajduk Split players
Austrian Football Bundesliga players
2. Liga (Austria) players
Austrian Regionalliga players
Croatian Football League players
Austrian expatriate footballers
Expatriate footballers in Croatia
Austrian expatriate sportspeople in Croatia